Aaron Hall may refer to:

 Aaron Hall (footballer) (born 1990), Australian rules footballer
 Aaron Hall (singer) (born 1964), American R&B singer and songwriter
 Aaron Hall (rugby union), Irish rugby union player
 Aaron Hall, founder of video game company Malfador Machinations
 Aaron Davis Hall, a performing arts center in Harlem